Hunan Institute of Engineering (HIE) is located in Xiangtan, Hunan, China. It was founded in 1951 and is organized into 16 schools and departments.

As of 2021, Hunan Institute of Engineering was ranked 371st in China and 768th globally by SCImago Institutions Rankings among research universities around the world. The Best Chinese Universities Ranking, also known as the "Shanghai Ranking", placed the university 441st in China.

History 
Approved by the Ministry of Education in June 2000, the official name of HNIE came into being as a result of the merger of Xiangtan Institute of Machinery and Electricity Technology and Hunan Textile College. Xiangtan Institute of Machinery and Electricity Technology, founded in 1951, affiliated with the former National Ministry of Machinery Industry, was appraised to be the national key construction modeling school of higher technical colleges of engineering. Hunan Textile College, founded in 1978, was attached to the Hunan Provincial Bureau of Textile Industry. HNIE is under the joint support of the central government and Hunan provincial government, the latter being mainly in charge of its administration.

Notable alumni 
 Wen Huazhi

References

Universities and colleges in Hunan